Institute of Laser Physics of the Siberian Branch of the RAS is a research institute in Akademgorodok of Novosibirsk, Russia. It was founded in 1991.

History
The history of the institute begins in the second half of the 1960s, when the Department of Laser Physics was created, headed by V. P. Chebotayev.

At first, the department became part of the Institute of Semiconductor Physics, and since 1978 it has been included in the Institute of Thermophysics.

In 1991, the Institute of Laser Physics was established on the basis of the Department of Laser Physics of the Institute of Thermophysics.

Activities
Laser devices of the institute are used in medicine. The scientific organization collaborates with the Novosibirsk Research Institute of Traumatology and Orthopedics and Meshalkin National Medical Research Center.

The institute is developing methods for diagnosing diabetes using terahertz radiation.

Institute scientists created the model of exoplanet atmosphere. They modeled a high-speed energy flow using special plasma sources.

Divisions
 Irkutsk Division of Institute of Laser Physics of the Siberian Branch of the RAS

Leaders
 Veniamin Pavlovich Chebotayev is the first director of the institute
 Sergey Nikolayevich Bagayev (1992–2016)
 Alexey Vladimirovich Taichenachev (since 2016)

Bibliography

References

External links
 Institute of Laser Physics of the Siberian Branch of the RAS. SB RAS.

Research institutes established in 1991
Research institutes in Novosibirsk
Laser companies